Mary Jane's Not a Virgin Anymore is an independent film written, directed, and produced by the self-anointed "Queen of Underground Film", Sarah Jacobson. It's a film about a teenage girl in the Twin Cities Area named Mary Jane who is curious about sex and thinks that by having sex, she will become cool. It focuses on the female perspective of sex. In the film, musicians Jello Biafra and Davey Havok appear in cameo roles. Tamra Davis helped finance the film. It was shown at a sold-out screening at the Sundance Film Festival in 1997.

Plot 
The film starts with a recreation of an overly glamorized 'Hollywood' vision of a girl losing her virginity. This is juxtaposed with high schooler Mary Jane (Lisa Gerstein) losing her virginity to Steve (Shane Kramer) which is shown to be uncomfortable and not at all glamorous. Mid-coitus, Jane requests that Steve stop, and she leaves to attend a party at the local cinema at which she works. She discusses her failed date with her fellow employees, bisexual punk musician Ericka (Beth Allen), alcoholic Matt (Andrew DeAngelo), Ryan (Bwana Spoons), who collects smiley-face memorabilia, and her understanding gay boss Dave (Greg Cruikshank). It's revealed that the employees have a habit of secretly placing bets on the outcomes of people's relationships and sexual activity. At the end of the night, Jane swears off both relationships and sex.

The next day, Jane is put in charge of training new employee Tom (Chris Enright). Steve shows up to ask Jane out again, though she promptly rejects him. In the midst of work, Jane is making a video project where she interviews her friends about being residents of the fictitious country of Zamboni, where women have equal rights to men. Presenting the unedited project to her class, she's met with disapproval from her straitlaced classmates.

Jane's friends begin to open up to her about their often embarrassing first times. Her friend Grace (Marny Snyder Spoons) relates that she was raped when she was 15, and consensually lost her virginity with a friend a month later. Ericka recalls having sex in a basement, with her partner whispering 'olive juice' post-coitus. Ericka suggests that Jane try masturbating to discover what she likes. Tom invites Jane to a party, after which she masturbates for the first time. Discussing it with Ericka the next day, it is revealed that Matt was Ericka's first lover.

Grace tells Jane and Ericka that she is five months pregnant, although it is soon revealed that Dave had already correctly guessed she was pregnant and placed a bet on it. That night, Tom and Jane have sex, which proves to be much more enjoyable than Jane's first time. The next morning, Jane is told that Matt has been fired for stealing from work, and that Dave will soon be leaving his job to renovate and run another theater. Matt decides to move to Alabama where he apparently has a girlfriend who can get him a job. Tom and Matt decide to go out for one final night of drinking together. The next day, Jane is told that Tom is in hospital after getting drunk and driving the wrong way down a one-way street; he soon dies of his injuries.

After Tom's funeral, Dave leaves the theater and is replaced by an abrasive and disorganized manager. Before long, both Ryan and Jane decide to quit. After spending a day together, Jane confesses that she has romantic feelings for Ryan, who tells her that, while flattered, he does not feel the same way, and wishes to remain friends.

The next year, having graduated high school, Jane moves to Boston and is a contributor to her friend's zine Olive Juice. Grace reveals that a blood test showed Tom to be the biological father of her child, which she has decided to keep. Dave is running a new theater with his lover, Kurt (Miles Long). While meeting with Ryan at a restaurant, Jane runs into Steve, who doesn't recognize her. Jane sees that Steve is meeting with her friend Allison (Alicia Rose), who reveals that she reads Olive Juice. Jane tells her that her first time with Steve was the basis for an article in the zine about an "awful thing that happened in the cemetery". After blowing off Steve, Allison is invited to come bowling with Jane and Ryan.

Cast 

 Lisa Gerstein as Mary Jane
 Chris Enright as Tom
 Greg Cruikshank as Dave
 Beth "Ramona" Allen as Ericka
 Marny Snyder Spoons as Grace
 Bwana Spoons as Ryan
 Andrew DeAngelo as Matt
 Shane Kramer as Steve
 Alicia J. Rose as Allison
 Davey Havok as George
 Miles Long as Kurt
 Siira Rieschl as Danny

Release 
The film had its premier at the Chicago Underground Film Festival on August 14, 1996. It was shown at a sold-out screenings at the Sundance Film Festival and South by Southwest in 1997. A Blu-ray and DVD compilation featuring Jacobson's 1993 film I Was a Teenage Serial Killer and several of her short films and music videos was released by the American Genre Film Archive on September 17, 2019.

Reception 
The film has received mainly positive reviews. Rotten Tomatoes reported an approval rating of 75% based on 8 reviews, with an average rating of 4.9/10. Kristin Tillotson called it "a raucous and real effort". Marjorie Baumgarten praised the script and performances while criticizing that "the film is rather short on plot and what there is, is awfully contrived". Film Threat reacted negatively to the film, calling it "an overly long, exceedingly talky, preachy film, something between a bad after-school special and a feminist version of Clerks".

References

External links
 
 
 

1997 films
Films set in a movie theatre
1990s English-language films
American sex comedy films
Films about virginity